Thomas Laudeley (born 18 November 1966) is a German former footballer.

References

External links

1966 births
Living people
German footballers
East German footballers
East Germany under-21 international footballers
Chemnitzer FC players
2. Bundesliga players
DDR-Oberliga players
VfB Fortuna Chemnitz players
Association football defenders